Strange Angels may refer to:

Albums
Strange Angels (Laurie Anderson album), 1989
Strange Angels (Kristin Hersh album), 1998

Books
Strange Angels (novel), a 1994 novel by Kathe Koja
Strange Angels, the first book in a series by Lilith Saintcrow (2009)

See also
Strange Angel, a 2018 historical drama web television series